Halltown, also known as Alanthus, is an unincorporated community in Franklin County, Alabama, United States.

History
Halltown is likely named for John T. Hall, the first postmaster of the community. A post office operated under the name Alanthus from 1881 to 1909.

References

Unincorporated communities in Franklin County, Alabama
Unincorporated communities in Alabama